Fès-Boulemane (Berber: ⴼⴰⵙ ⴱⵓⵍⵎⴰⵏ) was formerly one of the sixteen regions of Morocco from 1997 to 2015. It was situated in an agricultural region of northern Morocco, and borders Rif Mountains to the north. It covered an area of 19,795 km² and had a population of 1,808,295 (2014 census). The capital was Fès. In 2015, it expanded Taounate and Taza Provinces (formerly from the Taza-Al Hoceima-Taounate Region); and Meknès Prefecture and El Hajeb and Ifrane Provinces (formerly from the Meknès-Tafilalet Region) to form the Region of Fès-Meknès.

Administrative divisions
The region was made up of the following provinces and prefectures :

 Prefecture of Fès-Dar-Dbibegh
 Moulay Yacoub Province
 Sefrou Province
 Boulemane Province

Subdivisions

References

Former regions of Morocco